Wilson Building or Wilson Block may refer to:

 John A. Wilson Building, Washington, D.C.
 Wilson Building (Clinton, Iowa)
 Philip Wilson Building, Carmel-by-the-Sea, California
 Wilson Building (Fairfield, Iowa)
 Wilson Building (Camden, New Jersey)
 J. L. Wilson Building, Durant, Oklahoma, listed on the National Register of Historic Places listings in Bryan County, Oklahoma
 A. K. Wilson Building, Dallas, Oregon, listed on the National Register of Historic Places listings in Polk County, Oregon
 Wilson Block (Dallas, Texas)
 Wilson Building (Dallas, Texas)
 Wilson Warehouse, Buchanan, Virginia